Leptosiaphos blochmanni, also known commonly as the Zaire three-toed skink, is a species of lizard in the family Scincidae. The species is native to Central Africa.

Etymology
The specific name, blochmanni, is in honor of German zoologist Friedrich Johann Wilhelm Blochmann.

Geographic range
L. blochmanni is found in southwestern Rwanda. It may also occur in eastern Democratic Republic of the Congo and northern Burundi.

Description
There are three digits on each of the four feet.

Behavior
L. blochmanni is terrestrial and semifossorial.

Diet
L. blochmanni probably preys upon insects.

Reproduction
L. blochmanni is oviparous.

References

Further reading
Greer AE (1974). "The genetic relationships of the scincid lizard genus Leiolopisma and its relatives". Australian Journal of Zoology Supplementary Series 22 (31): 1–67. (Panaspis blochmanni, new combination).
Spawls S, Howell K, Hinkel H, Menegon M (2018). Field Guide to East African Reptiles, Second Edition. London: Bloomsbury Natural History. 624 pp. . (Leptosiaphos blochmanni, p. 158).
Tornier G (1903). "Drei neue Reptilien aus Ost-Afrika". Zoologische Jährbucher. Abtheilung für Systematik, Geographie und Biologie der Thiere 19: 173–178.  (Lygosoma blochmanni, new species, pp. 173–175). (in German).

Leptosiaphos
Reptiles described in 1903
Reptiles of the Democratic Republic of the Congo
Endemic fauna of the Democratic Republic of the Congo
Taxa named by Gustav Tornier